Ta'Niya Latson is an American college basketball player for the Florida State Seminoles of the Atlantic Coast Conference (ACC).

High school career
Latson played for Miami Country Day School in Miami and Charles W. Flanagan High School in Pembroke Pines, Florida during her freshman season, before moving to Westlake High School in Atlanta, Georgia. She was teammates with Raven Johnson at Westlake and led the team to its first GEICO Nationals title as a junior, as well as two state titles. For her senior season, Latson transferred to American Heritage School in Plantation, Florida. After leading the team to a Class 5A state title, she earned Miss Basketball, Gatorade Player of the Year and Class 5A Player of the Year honors for Florida. Latson was selected to play in the McDonald's All-American Game. Rated a five-star recruit by ESPN, she committed to play college basketball for Florida State over offers from Baylor, Georgia, Kentucky, Miami (FL), NC State, Texas and Virginia Tech.

College career
On November 7, 2022, Latson made her debut for Florida State, recording 28 points and nine rebounds in a 113–50 win over Bethune–Cookman. Three days later, in her second game, she scored 34 points in an 80–71 win over Kent State, the most points by a Florida State freshman since Sue Galkantas in 1981.

References

External links
Florida State Seminoles bio

Living people
American women's basketball players
Basketball players from Miami
Guards (basketball)
Florida State Seminoles women's basketball players
McDonald's High School All-Americans
American Heritage School (Florida) alumni
Miami Country Day School alumni
Year of birth missing (living people)